Taizicheng railway station, is a railway station in the Taizicheng, Chongli District, Zhangjiakou, Hebei. This station is the terminal of Chongli railway, and are only 2 km away from the Olympic Village center. The station hall started construction in August 2018 to build a high-speed railway station on the Chongli railway (Olympic branch of Beijing–Zhangjiakou intercity railway) opened on Dec 30, 2019.

Structure
The transfer center will be served as a temporary waiting hall with a railway culture exhibition center and temporary ticket office during the 2022 Olympic period.

Taizicheng station has two island platforms initially. To facilitate the entrance and exit for athletes and media workers, a basic side platform is added, forming a Spanish solution rarely in China Railway.

Design and construction

The architectural design is an image of mountains, with a crescent-shaped hyperbola outline extending to the ground and the main colour of white indicating the Winter Olympics. The 2022 winter Olympic game awarding square is opposite to the station, so this station will be the nature background for award ceremonies witnessing the presentation of 51 gold medals.

This station is designed by China Railway Engineering Consulting Group, and constructed by China Railway 6th Engineering Group. In June 2019,  the station building successfully capped its main structure.

Operation 
Taizicheng railway station adopts the electronic ticket system. Passengers scan their identity certificates such as ID cards or passports rather than a traditional magnetic ticket to check-in. The China Railway E Card or dynamic QR code in 12306 app is also applicable in this station.

Extension 
Chongli branch of Beijing–Zhangjiakou intercity railway was extended from Taizicheng railway station to Chongli railway station on 6 January 2022. In addition, by constructing or rebuilding railway lines the line will destinate in Xilinhot. The railway between Taizicheng and Xilinhot is also called Taizicheng–Xilinhot railway.

See also 

 Beijing–Zhangjiakou intercity railway
 Beijing North railway station

References 

Railway stations in Hebei
Railway stations in China opened in 2019